The Chicago Bears franchise was founded as the Decatur Staleys, a charter member of the American Professional Football Association (APFA). The team moved to Chicago, Illinois, in 1921 and changed its name to the Bears in 1922, the same year the APFA changed its name to the National Football League (NFL). This list documents the franchise's completed seasons from 1920 to present, including postseason records and results from postseason games.

The Chicago Bears have played over 1,000 games in their history, and have had eight NFL Championships victories and one Super Bowl win. The Bears' nine championships are the second most by any team in NFL history. The franchise has captured 18 NFL divisional titles and four NFL conference championships. The Bears have also recorded more regular season victories than any other NFL franchise.

The franchise has experienced three major periods of continued success in their history. In this period the Bears participated in the first National Football League playoff game, the first NFL Championship Game, and become the American football sports dynasty of the 1940s.

Despite their historic championship record and long periods of success, the Bears have also experienced periods of failure in their history. The franchise finished in last place within its division five times in the 1970s. In 1971, the team moved from Wrigley Field to Soldier Field to play its home games. In the mid- to late 1990s and early 2000s, the Bears posted six seasons with 10 or more losses. By chance, these two decades—the 1970s and 1990s—are the only decades in the Bears history that the franchise has not won or played for an NFL Championship or Super Bowl. In the  season, the franchise posted their worst regular season record with a 1–13 showing.

Legend

Season records

Footnotes
 No official standings were maintained for the 1920 season, and the championship was awarded to the Akron Pros in a League meeting on April 30, 1921. Teams played schedules that included games against nonleague opponents.
 The NFL did not hold playoff games until 1933. The team that finished with the best regular season record was named the league champions.
 The result of the 1932 NFL Playoff Game to determine the NFL champion between the Bears and the Portsmouth Spartans. The game counted in the standings and broke the tie.
 The score of the playoff game is in parenthesis with the winning score first no matter the outcome for the Bears.
 The Bears were denied perfect seasons on two accounts. The first one was in the 1934 when the 13–0 Bears lost to the New York Giants in the Championship game. The second occurrence happened in 1942 when the 11–0 Bears were denied perfection and a "three-peat" by the Washington Redskins.
 The Bears victory over the Redskins in the 1940 NFL Championship is an NFL record for greatest margin of victory and most points scored in a game.
 The Bears tied with the Rams for 1st place at the end of the season, but they lost a one-game playoff tiebreaker and therefore did not win a Conference Championship.
 The 1967 NFL season marks the first season in the league's history where the league was divided into two conferences which were subdivided into two divisions. Up to 1967, the league was either divided into two divisions, two conferences, or neither.
 As a result of the AFL–NFL merger, the league was broken into two conferences, with the AFL teams moving into the American Football Conference.
 As of the 2010 NFL season, this season marks the last tie game the Bears played. It was a game at Soldier Field on September 24, 1972 against the Los Angeles Rams. The game ended at 13–13.
 The 1982 season was a strike-shortened season so the league was divided up into two conferences instead of its normal divisional alignment.
 The Bears win in Super Bowl XX, marked the franchise's first Super Bowl victory and their ninth league championship.
 The strike of 1987 reduced the regular season schedule from 16 to 15 games.
 The Divisional Playoff game against the Eagles was known as the Fog Bowl due to the heavy fog that covered the field for most of the game.
 As of the 2010 NFL season, this is the second postseason meeting of the Bears and Green Bay Packers in their longstanding rivalry.

References
General
 
 
 
 
 
 
Specific

External links
 Chicago Bears season database

Seasons
Chicago Bears